Robert Bickersteth may refer to:

Robert Bickersteth (bishop) (1816–1884), Bishop of Ripon
Robert Bickersteth (MP) (1847–1916), Liberal MP, son of the above